In a World... is a 2013 American comedy film written, directed and co-produced by Lake Bell.

The film stars Bell as Carol Solomon, a vocal coach intent on doing voice-over work for film trailers. The film co-stars Demetri Martin, Fred Melamed, Rob Corddry, Michaela Watkins, Ken Marino, Nick Offerman, and Tig Notaro.

The film grossed $3.1 million against a production budget of less than $1 million, and received positive reviews from critics.

Plot
Sam Sotto is a Hollywood actor who is known as "king of voice-overs" for his extensive narration and voice-over work. He has recently published an autobiography and is about to receive a lifetime achievement award upon turning 60.

His 31-year-old daughter, Carol Solomon, is a struggling vocal coach who has always been overshadowed by her father. Carol agrees to help Eva Longoria to loop her accent as a British mob boss wife. Sam forces Carol to move out of his house so that he can live with his girlfriend Jamie, who is a year younger than Carol. Carol leaves to stay with her older sister Dani and her husband Moe.

An upcoming film series, The Amazon Games, plans to bring back the "In a world..." line made famous by the late Don LaFontaine. The trailer voice-over is highly sought after. Sam bows out so that his friend and heir-apparent, Gustav Warner, can assume the role, but Gustav develops laryngitis and fails to show up to a temp track recording. Carol happens to be at the studio doing other work with engineer Louis, and she substitutes for Gustav. Katherine Huling, the series' executive producer, decides she wants Carol for the job instead. Carol also gets other voice-over work, but she neglects to tell her self-absorbed father about her newfound success. Gustav and Sam feel entitled and are dismissive of the unknown woman who "stole" the job from them.

Carol visits Dani at the hotel where Dani works as concierge. Intrigued by the voice of a flirtatious Irish guest, she asks Dani to interview and record him for her voice archive. During the interview, Dani pretends to be single.

Carol joins Sam and Jamie at a party at Gustav's mansion. Gustav flirts with her, and Carol ends up staying the night. While waiting for Dani to come home from work, Moe listens to the recording of her interview with the hotel guest and is shocked at her lie. He leaves the apartment after she arrives.

Rumors spread quickly about Carol and Gustav. Gustav boasts to Sam of his night with some party-crasher, and when Gustav learns she is the woman in competition for the job, he decides to keep pursuing her, still not fully realizing who she is.

Sam and Jamie host a meal for Sam's daughters. It comes out that Carol is the mystery woman in the running for the coveted job. Sam is indignant, furious at Gustav, and dismissive of Carol, causing her to leave angry. Sam vows to compete for the job himself.

Dani is distraught about her husband, and Carol secretly records her anguish, sending the message to Moe to help win him back.

Competition for the job heats up. All three must send recordings for the studio to decide among. Carol is ready to drop out, but Louis champions her cause, also explaining that he likes her. Carol admits she likes him, too. They work together to produce the audition recording, then party together afterwards. At the end of the night, Louis finally kisses her.

Though Carol is still angry at her father, Moe insists that she and Dani go to the Golden Trailer Awards, where Sam is due to receive a lifetime achievement award. There the trailer for The Amazon Games is revealed; Carol got the job and is elated. Sam storms off. Jamie berates him and threatens to leave him if he does not grow up and show support for his daughters. During his acceptance speech, Sam is magnanimous in victory, dedicating the award to his daughters. In the ladies room, Carol encounters Huling, who bluntly tells Carol that she was not the best person for the job, but was chosen for the greater meaning of having a woman in that role.

Carol goes back to her work as a voice coach, helping low self-esteem, high-pitched, squeaky-voiced women to speak less like a "baby doll" or "sexy baby" and be taken more seriously as mature women, using her voice-over on The Amazon Games trailer as their inspiration.

Cast

Production

Background

The film's title was inspired by the phrase used by Don LaFontaine to start many film trailers.
According to Bell, almost no notable film trailers have employed female voice-over talent except for Gone in 60 Seconds (2000), which used Melissa Disney. Bell had been intrigued that the prototypical "omniscient" voice behind film trailers was male. This inspired her to write a story in which a female protagonist sought to overcome this prejudice, resulting in her feature-length writing, directing, and producing debut.

Bell wrote the screenplay with particular people in mind, hoping they would be interested in the project, explaining, "I was inspired to cast not only people who are great comedians but [...] who have a complex life [...] I knew that there was a profundity there that I wanted to tap into."
Bell also recruited her then boyfriend Scott Cambell as an art assistant for the film.

Filming

Production
Filming took place over 20 days in Los Angeles. Bell did extensive preparation work before the film, bringing lengthy notes. She deliberately filmed using shots in the style of a drama, although the film is a comedy. The "nose kiss" scene was suggested by Ken Marino, and it made Bell laugh so much she told him he would need to do it twice.

Locations
Locations include:
 The Scientology Celebrity Center
 The California Club
 The Millennium Biltmore Hotel lobby
 KCET Studios

The sound studio scenes were filmed at The Marc Graue Voice Over Studios, Burbank. Studio A, Studio 4, the hallways, reception area, kitchen and the upstairs entrance to Studio 3 are all shown.

Release

The film was well received at the Sundance Film Festival and it was picked up by Roadside Attractions for North American domestic distribution, and by Sony Pictures Worldwide Acquisitions for international distribution.

Reception

Critical response

Review-aggregation website Rotten Tomatoes gives the film a score of 92% based on 106 reviews. The site's consensus is, "A funny, well-written screwball satire for film buffs, In a World... proves an auspicious beginning for writer, director, and star Lake Bell."
Metacritic gives the film a weighted average score of 79/100 based on reviews from 29 critics, indicating "generally favorable reviews." This was the second highest Metacritic score for a comedy film in 2013. According to polls conducted by CinemaScore, audiences gave the film a B+ rating, on a scale from A to F.

A.O. Scott of The New York Times praised Bell, writing that she "plays Carol with a perfect blend of diffidence, goofiness and charm, has written and directed an insightful comedy that is much more complex and ambitious than it sometimes seems."

While noting that Bell is a former contributor to the publication, The Hollywood Reporter Todd McCarthy comments that the film is "a lively, sometimes very funny comedy" that offers an "amusing peek into a seldom-visited corner of showbiz," that is the world of Hollywood voice-over talent. McCarthy describes Sam as "genial and intimidating" and Carol as a "charming, neurotic live wire" who is also "shapely and quick-witted." Carol "has great delivery herself and is wonderful with accents and dialects," according to McCarthy. McCarthy notes that "all the actors pop with well-defined personalities," but that Melamed "formidably dominates" the film.

British critic Mark Kermode praised the film for its "sharp and very snarky" humor, said it "has just enough bite, and stays on the right side of bitter," and reserved special praise for Melamed, whose performance he called "absolutely brilliant." He also praised Bell for avoiding the smug, self-serving insider view that other Hollywood films fall foul to, and the well observed characters, and although he does not think it will be a huge hit, says he thinks it deserves to do well. According to National Public Radio, "Underneath the comedy, it's a moving story about female empowerment," with Bell's character Carol serving as voice-over industry counterpart to Rocky Balboa.

John Anderson of Variety notes the picture achieves its most important goal of making the voiceover industry something of interest to a broad audience. He describes it as "a rollicking laffer about the cutthroat voiceover biz in Los Angeles" and "a film with too many laugh lines to be absorbed in one sitting." Anderson describes Bell as a "magnetic, intelligent, blithely screwball leading lady in the Carole Lombard tradition."

Box office
The film opened in three theaters on August 9, 2013, with a total gross of $70,980, making it the weekend's number one in terms of overall per-theater-average gross ($23,660). Roadside Attractions planned to gradually expand, and roll-out the film to more theatres.

Accolades

In a World... won Best Screenplay at the 2013 Sundance Film Festival, where it debuted on January 20. Bell said she felt she had already won simply by being accepted for competition at Sundance. Bell was nominated for Best First Screenplay at the 2014 Spirit Awards. Bell was honored with the Breakthrough of the Year Award (shared with Joshua Oppenheimer—The Act of Killing) and was listed in the Best Actress top 10 honorees by the Dublin Film Critics' Circle.

The film was recognized by the National Board of Review as one of the top 10 independent films of 2013.

Music

The song "Everybody Wants to Rule the World" by the band Tears for Fears is featured in the film and plays over the end credits.

In addition to the soundtrack, the score, which was written by Ryan Miller of Guster, was released on September 24, 2013.

References

External links

 
 
 
 
 
 

2013 films
2013 comedy films
American comedy films
American independent films
Films about dysfunctional families
Lionsgate films
Sundance Film Festival award winners
Roadside Attractions films
2010s feminist films
Films about Hollywood, Los Angeles
2013 directorial debut films
2013 independent films
Films directed by Lake Bell
2010s English-language films
2010s American films